Jat-guksu is a Korean noodle dish consisting of wheat flour or buckwheat noodles in a bowl of cold broth made from ground pine nuts. It is a local specialty of Gapyeong, Gyeonggi Province where a great deal of pine nuts are harvested in South Korea. The recipe is quite similar to another summer dish, kong-guksu, which is a noodle dish with a soy milk broth, but jat-guksu has a cleaner and more savory taste.

See also 
 Korean noodles
 Kong-guksu
 Jatjuk
 List of buckwheat dishes
 List of Korean dishes

References

External links

Buckwheat dishes
Korean noodle dishes
Noodle soups
Cold noodles